"Tiến Quân Ca" (lit. "The Marching Song"), known in English as the "Marching Song", "Song of a Marching Army" or "Song of Advancing Soldiers", is the national anthem of Vietnam, written and composed by Văn Cao in 1944. The "Army Marching Song" was adopted as the national anthem of North Vietnam in 1954 and was adopted as the national anthem of the new unified Socialist Republic of Vietnam in 1976, following the reunification of North Vietnam and South Vietnam at the end of the Vietnam War. Though it has two verses, only the first one is usually sung, like the Star-Spangled Banner.

History
Its lyrics and title were based on Văn Cao's previous works, "Thăng Long" (lit. "Rising Dragon", a former name of Hanoi). Part of the lyrics were also different during its early stages, as it went through numerous changes starting in the early 1940s.

Lyric changes and completion
"Tiến Quân Ca" went through many changes shortly after it was composed. For instance, the first sentence "" ("The Vietnamese army marches") was originally "" ("The Viet Minh army marches""). The sixth part of the lyrics was also originally "" (We swear to tear apart the enemy and drink their blood), expressing his anger at the colonials administration for letting two million Vietnamese people perish. After many suggestions, Văn Cao changed it to "" ("For the people let's fight until the end"). The last sentence "" ("Together we shout onwards, our spirit is here") was changed to "" ("Vietnam's mountains and rivers shall be us forever"), but when it was published it was changed to "", which had the same meaning but a slightly different tone, which Văn Cao commented, "With a song that requires solemn, '' seemed too weak while being sung with '' would be more reasonable."

After completion of work, Văn Cao met and let Vũ Quý try the song. Vũ Quý was very happy at his work, and "Tiến Quân Ca" was published in papers in November 1944 with lithographs by Văn Cao.

On 17 August 1945, the song was sung for the first time at a rally of civil servants in Hanoi by a Ph.D under the flag of the Việt Minh,  and "robbed the loudspeakers". Văn Cao quoted, "That quiet man was an attraction to thousands of people listening that day".

The poet and musician Nguyễn Đình Thi was touched after hearing Văn Cao sing the song and asked each person to write another song for "The Viet Minh Frontline". He posted his own "", meaning "Killing Fascists". Văn Cao wrote "", meaning "Vietnam Soldiers". Both songs are still popular and sung to the public today.

As a national anthem
On 17 August 1945, Hồ Chí Minh approved "Tiến Quân Ca" to be officially recognized as the anthem of the Democratic Republic of Vietnam.

On 2 September 1945, marching was officially performed on the day of the Proclamation of Independence at Ba Đình Square by the Liberation Army band commanded by Đinh Ngọc Liên. At the day before the performance, musicians Dinh Ngoc Lien, Nguyen Huu Hieu, and Văn Cao discussed for changing the two words in "Tiến Quân Ca" in order to shorten the song by shortening the length of the first E pitches in the word "" and the F in the middle of the word "" to make the song more "snappy".

In 1946, the 1st National Assembly officially recognized "Tiến Quân Ca" as the national anthem. In the first Constitution of the Democratic Republic of Vietnam in Article 3, it states directly about the national anthem. In 1955, the 5th session of the first National Assembly decided to invite authors to participate in another editing of the song. Văn Cao had regrets after this because the "heroic spirit" of the song had been lost after being edited.

After 1975, the government of South Vietnam fell, and on 2 July 1976, the Provisional Revolutionary Government of the Republic of South Vietnam (in most common situation, the phrase "Viet Cong" actually refers to it) and the Democratic Republic of Vietnam agreed to be reunified into the new Socialist Republic of Vietnam. "Tiến Quân Ca" was chosen as the national anthem. In 1981, a contest was opened for a new national anthem but after more a year, it was and has never been mentioned again nor are there any official statement about the results. Thus, "Tiến Quân Ca" remains today as the national anthem of Vietnam.

Copyright

Copyright of the lyrics and the music sheet
In 2010, Nghiêm Thúy Băng, the wife of late musician Văn Cao, addressed a letter to the Minister of Culture, Sports and Tourism of Vietnam proposing to donate the work "Tien quan ca" to the public, the Party, the National Assembly and the State. This is also the wish of Văn Cao when he was still alive.

However, in 2015, the family of Văn Cao, registered the song with the Vietnam Center for Protection of Music Copyright, demanding royalties for all public performances except in certain situations like schools and "important state ceremonies". Văn Cao's eldest son Văn Thao said that his family "never reached consensus on 'gifting' the song, so they authorized the center to collect royalties on his father's songs".

The copyright announcement has angered many veteran musicians. Nguyen Quang Long says the "anthem must belong to the public, and people should be allowed to sing it without worrying about royalties". Singer Ánh Tuyết, who is best known for her performance of Cao's songs, agrees that the anthem "long ago became a song of the people, so it should be gifted to the people".

On 25 August 2015, the Ministry of Culture, Sports and Tourism sent an official letter to the music copyright agency to stop collecting royalties on "Tiến Quân Ca".

On 8 July 2016, Văn Thao confirmed that he and his family were going to donate the song to their country and people as his father's last wish. A letter, signed by all the legal inheritors in the family, stated that the family would donate the song for free use.

On 15 July 2016, The National Assembly Office held a ceremony in Hanoi to receive the national anthem, donated by family members of Văn Cao, and to bestow the composer with the Ho Chi Minh Order. Also at the ceremony, Deputy Prime Minister Vũ Đức Đam presented a certificate of merit from the Prime Minister to Nghiêm Thúy Băng, the composer's widow, in recognition of her efforts in preserving the composer's works.

Copyright of different recording versions of the anthem 
There are still disputes over the copyrights of each recording versions of the anthem, for example during the broadcasting the football match between Laos and Vietnam on 6 December 2021, the sound of anthem music was muted using the reason of copyrights. The copyright claims met with huge backlash from the author's family, the government, and other opinions who considered national anthem should be free for all. Opposite opinions claimed that although the lyric and music sheet of the anthem is free, it is legal to claim the copyright of specific recording versions of the anthem.

The Government then announced a "free" recording version of the national anthem which had been already published on the government website and emphasized that "Vietnamese laws strictly forbid the obstruction of popularizing the national anthem, directly or indirectly, under the regulation of rules and laws." The Department of Sport also issued an instruction called for the use of the "free" version published by the government. The "free" version was then used in subsequent sport events.

On 16 June 2022, the National Assembly of Vietnam passed the bill of "Amendments to some Articles of the Law on Intellectual property" related to "Tiến Quân Ca", in which Clause 2, Article 7 of the law was added to be: "The exercise of intellectual property rights must not infringe the interests of the State, the public interest or the legitimate rights and interests of other organizations and individuals, and must not breach other relevant provisions of law. Organizations and individuals exercising intellectual property rights related to the National Flag, National Emblem, National Anthem of the Socialist Republic of Vietnam must not obstruct their use and dissemination." The amendments were set to become effective on 1 January 2023.

See also
 Flag of Vietnam
 Giải phóng miền Nam, the national anthem of the Provisional Revolutionary Government of the Republic of South Vietnam

References

External links
Vietnam: Tiến Quân Ca - Audio of the national anthem of Vietnam, with information and lyrics
Tap Chi Xay Dung Dang, 08/1999 - Both a vocal and an instrumental version of the Anthem is available at the website for "Tap Chi Xay Dung Dang", the Constructive Magazine of the Communist Party of Vietnam.
MIDI

National anthems
Vietnamese songs
National symbols of Vietnam
Asian anthems
Military marches